Dimitri Boudaud (born 10 February 1987) is a French professional footballer who plays as a midfielder for Loon-Plage.

Career
Born in Charleville-Mézières, Boudaud played at professional level in Ligue 2 for CS Sedan Ardennes. Since 2009, he plays for Dunkerque.

External links
 
 Dimitri Boudaud profile at foot-national.com

1987 births
Living people
People from Charleville-Mézières
Sportspeople from Ardennes (department)
French footballers
Association football midfielders
CS Sedan Ardennes players
RC Épernay Champagne players
FC Montceau Bourgogne players
USL Dunkerque players
Ligue 2 players
Championnat National players
Footballers from Grand Est